Jang Hee-ryung (born November 11, 1993) is a South Korean actress and model. She is best known for starring in web series, notably Dream Knight, 72 Seconds, and Some Guy.

Filmography

Films

Television series

Music video appearances

Awards and nominations

References

External links
 Jang Hee-ryung at JYP Entertainment
 
 

1993 births
Living people
21st-century South Korean actresses
JYP Entertainment artists
South Korean film actresses
South Korean television actresses
South Korean web series actresses
Gyeongsang National University alumni